Masoumeh Pashaei Bahram (born 1981 in Marand), is an Iranian physician and politician and chairperson of the Iranian Parliamentary Assembly in the Asian Parliamentary Assembly (APA).

She is the only woman elected from East Azerbaijan province in the 11th round of the Islamic Parliament of Iran. She represents the electoral district of Marand and Jolfa.

Azadi Stadium attendance
In January 2022, Pashaei watched the match between Persepolis and Traktorsazi teams at Azadi Stadium. The presence of women in Iranian stadiums has limitations. After watching the match, she told reporters:

"This is the first time a female representative has attended Azadi Stadium, and it is a very good experience. I was also very proud to see the female reporters. We have to make the entrance of female spectators to the stadium because we live in a global village and we can not move against the flow of water."

She added: "We can provide special places for women and it is a pity that not everyone enjoys it. It was not for me to be in the stadium because there is no place in the stadium where I can come to the stadium more easily, but the officials have to provide the conditions for all the athletes to be in the stadium."

References 

1981 births

Living people
People from Marand
Members of the 11th Islamic Consultative Assembly
21st-century Iranian physicians
Iranian women physicians
Deputies of Marand and Jolfa